Toto XX: 1977–1997 is a compilation album by Toto to celebrate their 20th anniversary. The album features rare original demos, outtakes, previously unreleased recordings and live tracks from the band's 20-year career.

The first single released, "Goin' Home" was recorded during Bobby Kimball's brief first reunion with the band in 1989, prior to the record company's decision to replace him with new lead singer Jean-Michel Byron. The song had later been recorded by the band's then former singer Joseph Williams and released on his 1997 album 3.

Reception

AllMusic, not realizing that the album's nine studio tracks were all recorded nine years or more before its release, commented that "Essentially, this is a Toto reunion album, featuring nine new studio cuts and four live tracks[...]" and said that the material was more similar to that on Tambu than the band's most recent studio album. They praised the performances but concluded the release to be "not particularly interesting to anyone except hardcore fans". Vocalists Fergie Frederiksen and Jean-Michel Byron are the only former members of the band that do not appear on the booklet photo sleeve. Possibly because they are not featured on any song.

Track listing

"On the Run" (Recorded at the Montreux Jazz Festival '91) and "Dave's Gone Skiing (Instrumental)" (Recorded at the Standard Bank Arena, Johannesburg, South Africa in 1997) were omitted from the All In 1978–2018 release of this album.

Singles
Goin' Home / Tale of a Man

Personnel

 Steve Lukather, David Paich – executive producers

"Goin' Home"
Steve Lukather – guitars, backing vocals
David Paich – keyboards, backing vocals
Mike Porcaro – bass
Jeff Porcaro – drums, percussion
Bobby Kimball – lead vocals
Joseph Williams – backing vocals
Jim Horn – saxophones
Greg Ladanyi, Shep Lonsdale – recording
Bobby Schaper – mixing

"Tale of a Man"
Steve Lukather – guitars, backing vocals
David Paich – piano, backing vocals
Steve Porcaro – synthesizer
David Hungate – bass
Jeff Porcaro – drums
Bobby Kimball – lead vocals
Tom Knox – recording
Elliot Scheiner – mixing

"Last Night"
Steve Lukather – guitars
David Paich – keyboards
Mike Porcaro – bass
Jeff Porcaro – drums, percussion
Joseph Williams – lead vocals
Chris Thompson – backing vocals
Jerry Hey – horn arrangements, trumpet
Gary Grant – trumpet
Jim Horn, Tom Scott – saxophone
James Pankow – trombone
George Massenburg – recording
Elliot Scheiner – mixing

"In a Word"
Steve Lukather – guitars
David Paich – keyboards
Steve Porcaro – synthesizer
Mike Porcaro – bass
Jeff Porcaro – drums, percussion
Joseph Williams – lead vocals
Shep Lonsdale – recording
Greg Ladanyi – mixing

"Modern Eyes"
Steve Lukather – guitars, backing vocals
David Paich – keyboards, lead vocals, backing vocals
Steve Porcaro – synthesizer programming
Mike Porcaro – bass
Jeff Porcaro – synclavier drums, timbales
David Sanborn – saxophones
Jack Joseph – drums recording
Shep Lonsdale – music recording
Elliot Scheiner – mixing

"Right Part of Me"
Steve Lukather – guitars, backing vocals
David Paich – piano, backing vocals
Mike Porcaro – bass
Jeff Porcaro – drums
Bobby Kimball – lead vocals
David Paich, James Newton Howard, Marty Paich – string arrangements
Marty Paich – conductor
London Symphony Orchestra – strings
Greg Ladanyi – recording
John Kurlander – strings recording
Elliot Scheiner – mixing

"Mrs. Johnson"
Steve Lukather – guitars
David Paich – keyboards
Steve Porcaro – synthesizer
David Hungate – bass
Jeff Porcaro – drums
Bobby Kimball – lead vocals
Tom Knox – recording
Elliot Scheiner – mixing

"Miss Sun"
David Paich – moog bass, keyboards, lead vocals
Steve Lukather – guitars
Jeff Porcaro – drums
David Hungate – overdub bass fills
Lisa Dal Bello – lead harmonies
Tom Knox – recording, mixing

"Love Is a Man's World"
Steve Lukather – guitars
David Paich – moog bass, piano, synthesizer, lead vocals
Steve Porcaro – sequencer, programming
Jeff Porcaro – drums, percussion
Bobby Kimball – disco backing vocals
Michael Boddicker – synthesizer programming
Tom Knox – recording, mixing

"On the Run"
Steve Lukather – guitars, lead vocals
David Paich – keyboards, backing vocals
Mike Porcaro – bass
Jeff Porcaro – drums
Chris Trujillo – percussion
Fred White, Jacki Magee, Jenny Douglas-McRae - backing vocals
Dirk Schubert – recording, mixing

"Dave's Gone Skiing"
Steve Lukather – guitars
David Paich – keyboards
Mike Porcaro – bass
Simon Phillips – drums, percussion
Bop Studios – live recording
Richard Mitchell – engineering
David Segal, Kentse Mpahlwa – engineering assistants
Elliot Scheiner – mixing
Colin Finnie – technical

"Baba Mnumzane"
Jenny Douglas-McRae, John James – vocals
Family Factory (Margaret Motsage, Gift Villakazi, Victory Villakazi, Nomhlahla Radebe, Nokhanya Dlamini, Sibongile Maktathe) – vocals, percussion
Bop Studios – live recording
Richard Mitchell – engineering
David Segal, Kentse Mpahlwa – engineering assistants
Elliot Scheiner – mixing
Colin Finnie – technical

"Africa"
Steve Lukather – guitars
David Paich – keyboards, lead vocals
Mike Porcaro – bass
Simon Phillips – drums, percussion
Jenny Douglas-McRae, John James – backing vocals
Family Factory (Margaret Motsage, Gift Villakazi, Victory Villakazi, Nomhlahla Radebe, Nokhanya Dlamini, Sibongile Maktathe) – backing vocals, percussion
Bop Studios – live recording
Richard Mitchell – engineering
David Segal, Kentse Mpahlwa – engineering assistants
Elliot Scheiner – mixing
Colin Finnie – technical

References 

Toto (band) albums
1998 compilation albums
Albums recorded at Sunset Sound Recorders